Trace Beaulieu is an American comedian, puppeteer, writer, and actor. He played roles on Mystery Science Theater 3000 (MST3K) as well as his work with MST3K's successor Cinematic Titanic with the original creators and cast of MST3K.

Beaulieu briefly attended the University of Minnesota.

Mystery Science Theater 3000
For the first eight seasons of MST3K (1 at KTMA and 7 on Comedy Channel/Comedy Central), Beaulieu wrote for the show, operated and voiced the Crow T. Robot puppet, and played the role of Dr. Clayton Forrester, the head mad scientist at Gizmonic Institute. After the season five departure of series creator Joel Hodgson, the name of Dr. Forrester's company was changed to Deep 13 because Hodgson held the copyright for the word "Gizmonic" and requested that the show refrain from using the word after his departure. At the end of a truncated seventh season, Beaulieu left the series. Pearl Forrester (Mary Jo Pehl) replaced him as the head mad scientist and Bill Corbett took over the voicing and operation of Crow.

Work after MST3K
Beaulieu appeared as a semi-regular in Freaks and Geeks as the school's biology teacher, Mr. Lacovara. He also appeared in The West Wing episode "Bad Moon Rising". Beaulieu was a writer for America's Funniest Home Videos from 1998 to 2007. In 2002, he was the head writer, producer, and host of the pilot episode of the Animal Planet show People Traps. He has since starred in the 2010 computer game Darkstar: The Interactive Movie as first officer Ross Perryman. In 2013, he reprised his role as Crow for a brief cameo appearance in two episodes of the fourth season of Arrested Development, along with Joel. In 2015, Beaulieu appeared as ART in the Yahoo! original comedy series, Other Space.

Outside of acting, Beaulieu also wrote the script for the one-shot comic book Here Come the Big People, published by Event Comics. In 2010, Beaulieu completed work on a children's poetry book, Silly Rhymes for Belligerent Children, a dark, twisted, humorous collection illustrated by Len Peralta.

In 2014 Beaulieu released a musical short film entitled The Frank with the original MST3K cast, including Bill Corbett, who assumed the role of Crow after Beaulieu left MST3K. (Joel Hodgson appears in The Frank only as a voice-over, while a stand-in wears Joel's trademark red jumpsuit; Michael J. Nelson performs the same voiceover in the color version of "The Frank" available as a DVD extra.)

Beaulieu appeared on Ken Reid's TV Guidance Counselor podcast on June 16, 2016.

Beaulieu is currently the co-host of the comedic podcast on the Last Podcast Network, Movie Sign with the Mads, with Frank Conniff and Carolina Hidalgo where they discuss current and classic movies.

Cinematic Titanic
On October 30, 2007, Joel Hodgson announced he was starting a new series—distributed on DVD—with the same "riffing on bad movies" premise as MST3K. Called Cinematic Titanic, it featured several former MST3K cast and crew members: Beaulieu, J. Elvis Weinstein, Frank Conniff and Mary Jo Pehl.

Cinematic Titanic completed its final tour on December 30, 2013.

"The Mads Are Back" tour
Since 2015, Beaulieu has joined his former MST3K co-star Frank Conniff ("TV's Frank") and gone on tour as "The Mads Are Back", riffing older B-movies in front of live audiences. In the midst of the COVID-19 pandemic, Beaulieu and Conniff moved the show to a ticketed livestream format, offering monthly live-riffs of movies, including some they had previously screened on tour such as Glen or Glenda, The Tingler, and Walk The Dark Street.

References

External links 
 

Living people
American puppeteers
American male television actors
American television writers
American comedy writers
American male television writers
Writers from Minneapolis
University of Minnesota alumni
Screenwriters from Minnesota
Year of birth missing (living people)